This is a list of foreign ministers in 2014.

Africa
 Algeria - Ramtane Lamamra (2013–2017)
 Angola - Georges Rebelo Chicoti (2010–2017)
 Benin - Nassirou Bako Arifari (2011–2015)
 Botswana -
 Phandu Skelemani (2008–2014)
 Pelonomi Venson-Moitoi (2014–2018)
 Burkina Faso -
 Djibril Bassolé (2011–2014)
 Michel Kafando (2014–2015)
 Burundi - Laurent Kavakure (2011–2015)
 Cameroon - Pierre Moukoko Mbonjo (2011–2015)
 Cape Verde
Jorge Borges (2011–2014)
Jorge Tolentino (2014–2016)
 Central African Republic -
 Léonie Banga-Bothy (2013–2014)
 Toussaint Kongo Doudou (2014–2015)
 Chad - Moussa Faki (2008–2017)
 Comoros - El-Anrif Said Hassane (2013–2015)
 Republic of Congo - Basile Ikouébé (2007–2015)
 Democratic Republic of Congo - Raymond Tshibanda (2012–2016)
 Côte d'Ivoire - Charles Koffi Diby (2012–2016)
 Djibouti - Mahamoud Ali Youssouf (2005–present)
 Egypt
Nabil Fahmi (2013–2014)
Sameh Shoukry (2014–present)
 Equatorial Guinea - Agapito Mba Mokuy (2012–2018)
 Eritrea - Osman Saleh Mohammed (2007–present)
 Ethiopia - Tedros Adhanom (2012–2016)
 Gabon - Emmanuel Issoze-Ngondet (2012–2016)
 The Gambia
Aboubacar Senghore (2013–2014)
Mamour Alieu Jagne (2014)
Bala Garba Jahumpa (2014–2015)
 Ghana - Hanna Tetteh (2013–2017)
 Guinea - François Lonseny Fall (2012–2016)
 Guinea-Bissau
Fernando Delfim da Silva (2013–2014)
Mário Lopes da Rosa (2014–2015)
 Kenya - Amina Mohamed (2013–2018)
 Lesotho - Mohlabi Tsekoa (2007–2015)
 Liberia - Augustine Kpehe Ngafuan (2012–2015)
 Libya - disputed
Mohammed Abdelaziz (2012–2014) 
Mohammed al-Dairi (2014–2019) or
Mohamed al-Ghariani (2014–2015)
 Madagascar
Ulrich Andriantiana (acting) (2013–2014)
Arisoa Razafitrimo (2014–2015)
 Malawi -
 Ephraim Chiume (2012–2014)
 George Chaponda (2014–2016)
 Mali
Zahabi Ould Sidi Mohamed (2013–2014)
Abdoulaye Diop (2014–2017)
 Mauritania - Ahmed Ould Teguedi (2013–2015)
 Mauritius -
 Arvin Boolell (2008–2014)
 Étienne Sinatambou (2014–2016)
 Morocco - Salaheddine Mezouar (2013–2017)
 Western Sahara - Mohamed Salem Ould Salek (1998–2023)
 Mozambique - Oldemiro Balói (2008–2017)
 Namibia - Netumbo Nandi-Ndaitwah (2012–present)
 Niger - Mohamed Bazoum (2011–2015)
 Nigeria
Viola Onwuliri (acting) (2013-2014)
Aminu Wali (2014–2015)
 Rwanda - Louise Mushikiwabo (2009–2018)
 São Tomé and Príncipe
Natália Pedro da Costa Umbelina Neto (2012–2014)
Manuel Salvador dos Ramos (2014–2016)
 Senegal - Mankeur Ndiaye (2012–2017)
 Seychelles - Jean-Paul Adam (2010–2015)
 Sierra Leone - Samura Kamara (2012–2017)
 Somalia 
Fowsiyo Yussuf Haji Aadan (2012–2014)
Abdirahman Duale Beyle (2014–2015)
 Somaliland - Mohamed Yonis (2013–2015)
 Puntland 
Daud Mohamed Omar (2010–2014)
Ali Ahmed Faatah (2014–present)
 South Africa - Maite Nkoana-Mashabane (2009–2018)
 South Sudan - Barnaba Marial Benjamin (2013–2016)
 Sudan - Ali Karti (2010–2015)
 Swaziland – Mgwagwa Gamedze (2013–2018)
 Tanzania – Bernard Membe (2007–2015)
 Togo - Robert Dussey (2013–present)
 Tunisia
Othman Jerandi (2013–2014)
Mongi Hamdi (2014–2015)
 Uganda - Sam Kutesa (2005–2021)
 Zambia
Wilbur Simuusa (2013–2014)
Harry Kalaba (2014–2018)
 Zimbabwe - Simbarashe Mumbengegwi (2005–2017)

Asia
 Afghanistan
Ahmad Moqbel Zarar (2013–2014)
Atiqullah Atifmal (acting) (2014–2015)
 Armenia - Eduard Nalbandyan (2008–2018)
 Azerbaijan - Elmar Mammadyarov (2004–2020)
 Nagorno-Karabakh - Karen Mirzoyan (2012–present)
 Bahrain - Sheikh Khalid ibn Ahmad Al Khalifah (2005–2020)
 Bangladesh -
 Abul Hassan Mahmud Ali (2013–2014)
 Sheikh Hasina (2014)
 Abul Hassan Mahmud Ali (2014–2019)
 Bhutan - Rinzin Dorji (2013–2015)
 Brunei - Pengiran Muda Mohamed Bolkiah (1984–2015)
 Cambodia - Hor Namhong (1998–2016)
 China - Wang Yi (2013–present)
 East Timor - José Luís Guterres (2012–2015)
 Georgia -
 Maia Panjikidze (2012–2014)
 Tamar Beruchashvili (2014–2015)
 Abkhazia - Viacheslav Chirikba (2011–2016)
 South Ossetia - David Sanakoyev (2012–2015)
 India
Salman Khurshid (2012–2014)
Sushma Swaraj (2014–2019)
 Indonesia
Marty Natalegawa (2009–2014)
Retno Marsudi (2014–present)
 Iran - Mohammad Javad Zarif (2013–2021)
 Iraq -
 Hoshyar Zebari (2003–2014)
 Hussain al-Shahristani (acting) (2014)
 Ibrahim al-Jaafari (2014–2018)
 Kurdistan - Falah Mustafa Bakir (2006–2019)
 Israel - Avigdor Lieberman (2013–2015)
 Palestinian Authority - Riyad al-Maliki (2007–present)
 Gaza Strip (in rebellion against the Palestinian National Authority) - Ismail Haniyeh (acting) (2012–2014)
 Japan - Fumio Kishida (2012–2017)
 Jordan - Nasser Judeh (2009–2017)
 Kazakhstan – Erlan Idrissov (2012–2016)
 North Korea
Pak Ui-chun (2007–2014)
Ri Su-yong (2014–2016)
 South Korea - Yun Byung-se (2013–2017)
 Kuwait - Sheikh Sabah Al-Khalid Al-Sabah (2011–2019)
 Kyrgyzstan - Erlan Abdyldayev (2012–2018)
 Laos - Thongloun Sisoulith (2006–2016)
 Lebanon
Adnan Mansour (2011–2014)
Gebran Bassil (2014–2020)
 Malaysia - Anifah Aman (2009–2018)
 Maldives - Dunya Maumoon (2013–2016)
 Mongolia
Luvsanvandan Bold (2012–2014)
Lundeg Purevsuren (2014–2016)
 Myanmar - Wunna Maung Lwin (2011–2016)
 Nepal
Madhav Prasad Ghimire (2013–2014)
Mahendra Pandey (2014–2015)
 Oman - Yusuf bin Alawi bin Abdullah (1982–2020)
 Pakistan - Sartaj Aziz (2013–2017) 
 Philippines - Albert del Rosario (2011–2016)
 Qatar - Khalid bin Mohammad Al Attiyah (2013–2016)

 Saudi Arabia - Prince Saud bin Faisal bin Abdulaziz Al Saud (1975–2015)
 Singapore - K. Shanmugam (2011–2015)
 Sri Lanka - G. L. Peiris (2010–2015)
 Syria - Walid Muallem (2006–2020)
 Taiwan - David Lin (2012–2016)
 Tajikistan - Sirodjidin Aslov (2013–present)
 Thailand -
 Surapong Tovichakchaikul (2011–2014)
 Phongthep Thepkanjana (acting) (2014)
 Thanasak Patimaprakorn (2014–2015)
 Turkey
Ahmet Davutoğlu (2009–2014)
Mevlüt Çavuşoğlu (2014–2015)
 Turkmenistan - Raşit Meredow (2001–present)
 United Arab Emirates - Sheikh Abdullah bin Zayed Al Nahyan (2006–present)
 Uzbekistan - Abdulaziz Komilov (2012–present)
 Vietnam - Phạm Bình Minh (2011–2021)
 Yemen -
 Abu Bakr al-Qirbi (2001–2014)
 Jamal Abdullah al-Sallal (2014)
 Abdullah al-Saidi (2014–2015)

Europe
 Albania - Ditmir Bushati (2013–2019)
 Andorra - Gilbert Saboya Sunyé (2011–2017)
 Austria - Sebastian Kurz (2013–2017)
 Belarus - Vladimir Makei (2012–present)
 Belgium - Didier Reynders (2011–2019)
 Brussels-Capital Region - Guy Vanhengel (2013–2019)
 Flanders
Kris Peeters (2008–2014)
Geert Bourgeois (2014–2019)
 Wallonia -
 Rudy Demotte (2009–2014)
 Paul Magnette (2014–2017)
 Bosnia and Herzegovina - Zlatko Lagumdžija (2012–2015)
 Bulgaria
Kristian Vigenin (2013–2014)
Daniel Mitov (2014–2017)
 Croatia - Vesna Pusić (2011–2016)
 Cyprus - Ioannis Kasoulidis (2013–2018)
 Northern Cyprus - Özdil Nami (2013–2015)
 Czech Republic
Jan Kohout (2013–2014)
Lubomír Zaorálek (2014–2017)
 Denmark -
 Holger K. Nielsen (2013–2014)
 Martin Lidegaard (2014–2015)
 Greenland
Aleqa Hammond (2013–2014)
Kim Kielsen (acting) (2014)
Vittus Qujaukitsoq (2014–2017)
 Faroe Islands - Kaj Leo Johannesen (2011–2015)
 Estonia
Urmas Paet (2005–2014)
Anne Sulling (acting) (2014)
Keit Pentus-Rosimannus (2014–2015)
 Finland - Erkki Tuomioja (2011–2015)
 France - Laurent Fabius (2012–2016)
 Germany - Frank-Walter Steinmeier (2013–2017)
 Greece - Evangelos Venizelos (2013–2015)
 Hungary
János Martonyi (2010–2014)
Tibor Navracsics (2014)
Péter Szijjártó (2014–present)
 Iceland - Gunnar Bragi Sveinsson (2013–2016)
 Ireland
Eamon Gilmore (2011–2014)
Charles Flanagan (2014–2017)
 Italy -
 Emma Bonino (2013–2014)
 Federica Mogherini (2014)
 Paolo Gentiloni (2014–2016)
 Latvia - Edgars Rinkēvičs (2011–present)
 Liechtenstein - Aurelia Frick (2009–2019)
 Lithuania - Linas Antanas Linkevičius (2012–2020)
 Luxembourg - Jean Asselborn (2004–present)
 Macedonia - Nikola Poposki (2011–2017)
 Malta - George Vella (2013–2017)
 Moldova - Natalia Gherman (2013–2016)
 Transnistria - Nina Shtanski (2012–2015)
 Gagauzia - Svetlana Gradinari (2013-2015)
 Monaco - José Badia (2011–2015)
 Montenegro - Igor Lukšić (2012–2016)
 Netherlands -
 Frans Timmermans (2012–2014)
 Bert Koenders (2014–2017)
 Norway - Børge Brende (2013–2017)
 Poland
Radosław Sikorski (2007–2014)
Grzegorz Schetyna (2014–2015)
 Portugal - Rui Machete (2013–2015)
 Romania
Titus Corlăţean (2012–2014)
Teodor Meleșcanu (2014)
Bogdan Aurescu (2014–2015)
 Russia - Sergey Lavrov (2004–present)
 San Marino - Pasquale Valentini (2012–2016)
 Serbia
Ivan Mrkić (2012–2014)
Ivica Dačić (2014–2020)
 Kosovo
Enver Hoxhaj (2011–2014)
Hashim Thaçi (2014–2016)
 Slovakia - Miroslav Lajčák (2012–2020)
 Slovenia - Karl Erjavec (2012–2018)
 Spain - José Manuel García-Margallo (2011–2016)
 Catalonia - Francesc Homs Molist (2012–2015)
 Sweden
Carl Bildt (2006–2014)
Margot Wallström (2014–2019)
 Switzerland - Didier Burkhalter (2012–2017)

 Ukraine
Leonid Kozhara (2012–2014)
Andriy Deshchytsia (acting) (2014)
Pavlo Klimkin (2014–2019)
Donetsk People's Republic
 Ekaterina Gubareva (2014)
Aleksandr Karaman (2014)
Aleksandr Kofman (2014-2016)
Lugansk People's Republic - vacant (2014) 
 United Kingdom -
 William Hague (2010–2014)
 Philip Hammond (2014–2016)
 Scotland - Fiona Hyslop (2009–2020)
 Jersey - Sir Philip Bailhache (2013–2018)
 Vatican City
Archbishop Dominique Mamberti (2006–2014)
Archbishop Paul Gallagher (2014–present)

North America and the Caribbean
 Antigua and Barbuda
Baldwin Spencer (2005–2014)
Charles Fernandez (2014–2018)
 The Bahamas - Fred Mitchell (2012–2017)
 Barbados - Maxine McClean (2008–2018)
 Belize - Wilfred Elrington (2008–2020)
 Canada - John Baird (2011–2015)
 Quebec
Jean-François Lisée (2012–2014)
Christine St-Pierre (2014–2018)
 Costa Rica
Enrique Castillo (2011–2014)
Manuel González Sanz (2014–2018)
 Cuba - Bruno Rodríguez Parrilla (2009–present)
 Dominica
Roosevelt Skerrit (2010–2014)
Francine Baron (2014–2019)
 Dominican Republic -
 Carlos Morales Troncoso (2004–2014)
 Andrés Navarro (2014–2016)
 El Salvador
Jaime Miranda (2013–2014)
Hugo Martínez (2014–2018)
 Grenada -
 Nickolas Steele (2013–2014)
 Clarice Modeste-Curwen (2014–2016)
 Guatemala
Fernando Carrera (2013–2014)
Carlos Raúl Morales (2014–2017)
 Haiti
Pierre Richard Casimir (2012–2014)
Duly Brutus (2014–2015)
 Honduras - Mireya Agüero (2013–2015)
 Jamaica - Arnold Nicholson (2012–2016)
 Mexico - José Antonio Meade Kuribreña (2012–2015)
 Nicaragua - Samuel Santos López (2007–2017)
 Panama -
 Fernando Núñez Fábrega (2013–2014)
 Francisco Álvarez De Soto (2014)
 Isabel Saint Malo (2014–2019)
 Puerto Rico – David Bernier (2013–2015)
 Saint Kitts and Nevis - Patrice Nisbett (2013–2015)
 Saint Lucia - Alva Baptiste (2011–2016)
 Saint Vincent and the Grenadines - Camillo Gonsalves (2013–2015)
 Trinidad and Tobago - Winston Dookeran (2012–2015)
 United States of America - John Kerry (2013–2017)

Oceania
 Australia - Julie Bishop (2013–2018)
 Fiji - Ratu Inoke Kubuabola   (2009–2016)
 French Polynesia -
 Gaston Flosse (2013–2014)
 Édouard Fritch (2014–present)
 Kiribati - Anote Tong (2003–2016)
 Marshall Islands
Phillip H. Muller (2012–2014)
Tony deBrum (2014–2016)
 Micronesia - Lorin S. Robert (2007–2019)
 Nauru - Baron Waqa (2013–2019)
 New Zealand - Murray McCully (2008–2017)
 Cook Islands - Henry Puna (2013–2020) 
 Niue - Toke Talagi (2008–2020)
 Tokelau
Salesio Lui (2013–2014)
Kuresa Nasau (2014–2015)
 Palau - Billy Kuartei (2013–2017)
 Papua New Guinea - Rimbink Pato (2012–2019)
 Samoa - Tuilaepa Aiono Sailele Malielegaoi (1998–2021)
 Solomon Islands
Clay Forau Soalaoi (2012–2014)
Milner Tozaka (2014–2019)
 Tonga -
 Sialeʻataongo Tuʻivakanō (2010–2014)
 ʻAkilisi Pōhiva (2014–2017)
 Tuvalu - Taukelina Finikaso (2013–2019)
 Vanuatu
Edward Natapei (2013–2014)
Sato Kilman (2014–2015)

South America
 Argentina - Héctor Timerman (2010–2015)
 Bolivia - David Choquehuanca (2006–2017)
 Brazil - Luiz Alberto Figueiredo (2013–2015)
 Chile -
 Alfredo Moreno Charme (2010–2014)
 Heraldo Muñoz (2014–2018)
 Colombia - María Ángela Holguín (2010–2018)
 Ecuador - Ricardo Patiño (2010–2016)
 Guyana - Carolyn Rodrigues (2008–2015)
 Paraguay - Eladio Loizaga (2013–2018)
 Peru
Eda Rivas (2013–2014)
Gonzalo Gutiérrez Reinel (2014–2015)
 Suriname - Winston Lackin (2010–2015)
 Uruguay - Luis Almagro (2010–2015)
 Venezuela
Elías Jaua (2013–2014)
Rafael Ramírez (2014)
Delcy Rodríguez (2014–2017)

References

http://rulers.org

Foreign ministers
2014 in international relations

Foreign ministers
2014